The SKV Rutesheim is a German association football club based in the city of Rutesheim, that competes in the Landesliga Württemberg.

History 
The Sport- und Kulturvereinigung Rutesheim was founded on 30 September 1945. It is the successor side to Freie Sportvereinigung Rutesheim founded on 17 July 1920 and disbanded in 1933 under the politically motivated policies of the Nazis which saw the dissolution of left-leaning worker's clubs like FSR, as well as clubs with religious affiliations.

The biggest achievement of the footballers of the SKV was their climb into the third-tier Amateurliga Nordwürttemberg in 1976. They lasted only a single season at that level, finishing in last place with only 10–50 points and 23–66 goals against. From 2008 to 2011, the club has played in the sixth-tier Verbandsliga Württemberg, but was relegated again at the end of the 2010–11 season.

Honours 
The club's honours:

First team 
 2nd Amateurliga
 Champions: 1975–76
 Kreisliga A
 Champions: 2000–01
 Bezirksliga Enz/Murr
 Champions: 2004–05
 Landesliga Staffel I
 Champions: 2007–08

Reserve team 
 Kreisliga B
 Champions: 2005–06
 Kreisliga A
 Champions: 2008–09

Recent seasons 
The recent season-by-season performance of the club:

 With the introduction of the Regionalligas in 1994 and the 3. Liga in 2008 as the new third tier, below the 2. Bundesliga, all leagues below dropped one tier.

Other departments 
 handball
 gymnastics
 singing
 volleyball
 table tennis
 sports badge / walking

Stadia 
The SKV Rutesheim is playing at Sportpark Bühl for home matches. Beside the stadium Bühl there are two more turf grounds (Spitzwiesen and Jugendkleinspielfeld), an artificial turf ground, a small synthetic ground for training, and a DFB-mini-ground (artificial turf). Also there are the sports halls Bühl I and Bühl II for the handball, gymnastics and volleyball departments and the youth and senior footballers.

Before 1986 the ground Schelmenäcker behind today's festival hall was the home of the club. Today on the former ground there is a residential area.

References

External links 
Official website

Football clubs in Germany
Football clubs in Baden-Württemberg
Association football clubs established in 1945
1945 establishments in Germany
Böblingen (district)